A writ of coram nobis (also writ of error coram nobis, writ of coram vobis, or writ of error coram vobis) is a legal order allowing a court to correct its original judgment upon discovery of a fundamental error that did not appear in the records of the original judgment's proceedings and that would have prevented the judgment from being pronounced. The term coram nobis is Latin for "before us" (i.e., the king) and the meaning of its full form, is "which [things] remain in our presence".  The writ of coram nobis originated in the courts of common law in the English legal system during the sixteenth century.

The writ of coram nobis still exists today in a few courts in the United States. In 1907, the writ became obsolete in England and replaced by other means of correcting errors; however, the writ survives in the United States in various forms in the federal courts, in the courts of sixteen states, and the District of Columbia courts. For those courts with the authority to issue a writ of coram nobis, the rules and guidelines differ – sometimes significantly. Each state is free to operate its own coram nobis procedures independent of other state courts as well as the federal court system. In other words, the criteria required to issue the writ in one state (or federal) court system are different from the criteria required to issue the writ in a different court system. A writ can be granted only by the court where the original judgment was entered, so those seeking to correct a judgment must understand the criteria required for that specific court.

History

England
The writ of error coram nobis originated in England over 500 years ago. The name of the writ combines three terms: writ, writ of error, and coram nobis. A writ is an official written command, while a writ of error provides a superior court the means to correct errors of a lower court. A writ of error coram nobis is a variation of the writ of error providing a court with the means to correct its own errors.

Writ 
Sometime before the tenth century, officials in England began utilizing writs to convey orders. A "writ" was simply a short written command issued by a person in authority. It was customary for the sender to seal such a command as proof of its authenticity. In the days when writing was a rare art, a writ was revered because the person receiving the command was unlikely to deny or question its legitimacy. The Norman Conquest of England in 1066 led to the establishment of a strong, centralized monarchy. The first Norman King of England, William the Conqueror, modified writs to become mainly framed in Latin, increased the number of writs to cover additional royal commands, and established the Curia Regis  in England. The Curia Regis, a Latin term meaning "royal council", consisted of the King of England and his loyal advisors. The Curia Regis accompanied the King as he travelled. This council administered all of the King's governmental activities, including judicial matters.

One of the most important members of the Curia Regis was the Lord Chancellor. The Lord Chancellor led the chancery. Chancery is a general term for a medieval writing office that was responsible for the production of official documents. The Lord Chancellor wrote writs on behalf of the King, maintained all official documents, and acted as the keeper of the royal seal. This position, in effect, placed the Lord Chancellor as the head of the English legal system. The King, however, was the ultimate leader of the kingdom; therefore, the Lord Chancellor issued writs under the guidance of what he believed to be in the best interests of the King. Between the twelfth and thirteenth centuries, the Lord Chancellor had a large control over the issuance of all original writs. An original writ began a legal proceeding, while a judicial writ was issued during a legal proceeding.

Writ of error 
One such "original" writ was the writ of error. In medieval England, a "petition of error" requested higher courts to review the legality of an order or sentence (similar to what is now known as an appeal). Petitioners brought a petition of error before the Lord Chancellor. Due to his position and close relationship with the law, the Lord Chancellor could naturally determine if the petition provided sufficient evidence of an error and, if so, the type of writ most appropriate to correct the error. If a lower court committed an error of law, the Lord Chancellor would issue a writ of error. A writ of error required the lower court to deliver the "records" of the case to a superior court where the court reviewed the case for legal errors. Because a writ of error was only available for a higher court to determine if a lower court committed an error of law, courts needed another type of writ to correct its own decision upon an error of fact. To rectify this issue, the Lord Chancellor created a new writ - the writ of error coram nobis. Thus, the original writ of coram nobis provided the means to correct errors that the writ of error could not correct. Unlike the writ of error, the writ of coram nobis:
 corrected only factual errors that were not raised in the original case proceedings,
 allowed the same court that presided over the original case to correct its own error, and
 required the original case records to remain with the court that presided over the original case.

Writ of error coram nobis 

"Coram nobis" is Latin for "before us". Initially, when the Lord Chancellor issued orders on behalf of the King and the royal court, the word "us" simply referred to the King, the Lord Chancellor, and other judges of this court. The royal court originated within the Curia Regis, which began during the twelfth and thirteenth centuries, under the realm of Henry the Second (Henry II). Henry II made writs available for purchase by private individuals seeking justice, thus initiating a vast expansion of writs within the common law. The increased demand of judicial maters before the Curia Regis in the twelfth century led to the establishment of two central courts: the Court of King's Bench and the Court of Common Pleas. These courts became the superior courts to all other courts in England, including local and tribunal courts such as the Hundred Courts and Court of Piepowders.

 The Court of King's Bench heard all complaints and pleas addressed to the King. This court was also known as the Court of Queen's Bench during the reign of a female monarch. Members of this court included the King and his closest advisors. This court always travelled with the King as he travelled throughout England and into other countries. When the Lord Chancellor issued the writ to the court of King's Bench, the original full name of the writ was quae coram nobis resident or "Let the record remain before us". The words "let the record remain" indicate the court record of the original case remained with the court of King's Bench, unlike a writ of error, where the record moved to a different court. The words "coram nobis" referred to the role of the King who served on the King's Bench. The King's place on the court of King's Bench became increasingly irregular; and by 1421, the King's Bench became a fixed court rather than one that followed the King. Although the King's presence was theoretical, the Lord Chancellor and his office continued to issue writs as if the King continued to as part of this court.
 The Court of Common Pleas was authorized by Magna Carta to sit in a central, fixed location. This court heard complaints and pleas that did not require the King's presence. When the Lord Chancellor issued the writ to the court of Common Pleas, the original full name was quae coram vobis resident, or "Let the record remain before you". These words indicate that the records of the original case remained with the judges of the Court of Common Pleas so that it may review a case it previously decided to determine if an error of fact occurred.

Over time, the authority to issue writs shifted from the Lord Chancellor to the courts. Although the King was no longer part of the court issuing the writ, the name "coram nobis" continued because courts associated the name with its function rather than its original Latin meaning. Thus, in English law, the definition of "coram nobis" evolved and is now redefined as a remedy for a court to correct its own error.

Abolition in English courts
The first case involving the writ of coram nobis is unknown due to incomplete historical records prior to the sixteenth century; however, the first recorded case involving the writ of coram nobis occurred in 1561 in the case of Sir Gilbert Debenham and Another v. Bateman. Until 1705, the writ of error was originally a matter entirely up to the discretion of either the monarch or those with the authority to make decisions on behalf of the monarch; but in 1705, the court held that the writ was a matter of right instead of a matter of discretion. Despite making writs of error a matter of right, courts rarely used these writs because of their cumbersome and impractical procedure. A writ of error moved the record from the original court to a higher court; however, the record only contained information on the arraignment, the plea, the issue, and the verdict. The record did not include the most material parts of a trial, including the evidence and the judge's direction to the jury.  As a result, England abolished all writs of error, including the writs of coram nobis and coram vobis, and replaced them with appellate procedures encompassing all rights previously available through these writs.  Thus, the abolition of the writ of coram nobis in England was due mostly to administration difficulties with the writ of error, and not because of administration difficulties with the writ of coram nobis itself.  The law abolishing the writ in civil cases was the Common Law Procedure Act 1852. The law abolishing the writ in criminal cases was the Criminal Appeal Act 1907.

United States
After arriving in North America in the seventeenth century, English settlers established English colonies. Within these colonies, the settlers created colonial courts that adhered to the English legal system and issued writs in the same manner as English courts. After the United States obtained independence from England, state governments, as well as the federal government, provided courts the authority to continue to rely upon writs as a source of law unless issuing the writ violated the state or federal constitution or if either the state or federal government subsequently enacted a statute restricting the writ. The purpose of allowing courts to issue writs was to fill a void whenever the state constitution, state statutes, the U.S. Constitution or federal statutes did not address an issue to be decided before the court.  Writs were especially important when the federal government, as well as each state, first established its judicial system.  During those times, there were very few (if any) statutes or case laws for courts to rely upon as guidance. In those circumstances, the English writs provided fledgling federal and state courts an important source of law.
Over time, writs became significantly less important as Congress and state legislatures enacted more statutes and further defined rules for its judiciary.  Writs also evolved independently in the federal judicial system and each state's judicial system so that a writ within one judicial systems may have a vastly different purpose and procedures from the same writ in other judicial systems. Different characteristics of a writ from one judicial system to another is the result of the federal system of government prescribed within the United States Constitution.  Federalism in the United States is a mixed system of government that combines a national federal government and state governments.  While federal courts are superior to state courts in federal matters, the Constitution limits the reach of federal courts; thereby, providing state courts general sovereignty and law-making authority over a wider range of topics. This sovereignty allows each judicial system to decide whether to adopt writs and the function and purpose of each writ it adopts. Thus, the use and application of writs, including the writ of coram nobis, can vary within each of these judicial systems.

Legislation authorizes a judicial system to issue the writ of coram nobis under one of two conditions:
Where legislation permits courts to issue writs, but the legislation does not specifically mention the writ of coram nobis. Courts throughout the United States generally have the authority to issue writs whenever the constitution or statutes encompassing a court's jurisdiction do not address an issue before the court and issuance of the writ is necessary to achieve justice.  This authority was especially important for earlier courts when there were few statutes or case law to rely upon.  Over time, legislatures enacted statutes encompassing almost all issues that could arise before a court.  As a result, courts today rarely need to rely on writs as a source of law to address an issue not covered by statute. One example of a rare issue where courts have the occasion to issue the writ of coram nobis is the issue of former federal prisoners who have new information and this new information would have resulted in a different verdict if the information were available at the time of trial. Whenever this specific issue comes before a federal court, there is no federal statute that specifically guides or regulates how the court must proceed; however, federal courts have determined that the writ of coram nobis is the proper vehicle to achieve justice under this specific issue.
Where legislation specifically permits courts to issue, by name,  the writ of coram nobis. The use of writs in the United States is more common when legislation has authorized a writ by name and regulated its use by courts.  For earlier courts, the practice of issuing writs was an integral part of the judicial system's proceedings. Therefore, when legislatures enacted laws to regulate issues associated with writs, some legislatures adopted the exact name of the writ within its rules while other legislatures chose to abolish the names of the writ but provided an alternative remedy under a different name.  Tennessee is an example of a state where its legislature enacted a statute expressly authorizing courts to issue, by name, the "Writ of Error Coram Nobis" and regulated how this writ should be issued. In contrast, other states replaced the writ of coram nobis with other post-conviction remedies. For example, the Pennsylvania legislature enacted a law on January 25, 1966, that expressly abolished the name "writ of coram nobis" and enacted the state's Post Conviction Relief Act, which is now the sole means for obtaining post-conviction relief.

Coram nobis in United States federal courts
In 1789, Congress passed the Judiciary Act to establish the judicial courts in the United States. This Act also allows courts to issue writs, including the writ of coram nobis. Originally, federal courts applied the writ of coram nobis only to correct technical errors, such as those made by a clerk of the court in the records of the proceedings. The 1914 Supreme Court case United States v. Mayer, expanded the scope of the writ of coram nobis to include fundamental errors, but the Court declined in this case to decide whether federal courts are permitted to issue the writ of coram nobis. In 1954, the Supreme Court determined in United States v. Morgan that federal courts are permitted to issue the writ of coram nobis to correct fundamental errors, such as those where discovery of new information is sufficient to prove a convicted felon is actually innocent. Since the Morgan case, federal courts traditionally issue a writ of coram nobis whenever a former federal prisoner petitions the original sentencing court to set aside the conviction based upon new information that was not available when the petitioner was in-custody and where this new information demonstrates that the conviction was a result of a fundamental error.

History of the writ of coram nobis in federal courts from 1789 to 1954

The Judiciary Act of 1789
The history of the writ of coram nobis in United States federal courts began in 1789 when Congress enacted the Judiciary Act. Under Section 14 of the Judiciary Act, federal courts have the authority to issue a writ whenever the court deems it necessary to achieve justice and whenever no congressional law covers the issues before the court. This section was known as the "All-Writs Provision" of the Judiciary Act until 1948 when it became more commonly known as the "All-Writs Act" after Congress modified the Judicial Code and consolidated this provision into . Under the All Writs Act, federal district courts have the "power to issue writs of scire facias, habeas corpus, and all other writs not specifically provided for by statute". Congress had not specifically provided by statute the authority for federal courts to issue a writ of coram nobis; therefore, the All Writs Act provides federal courts this authority.

The first case in a federal court to address the writ of coram nobis was Strode v. The Stafford Justices in 1810. In this case, the Supreme Court Chief Justice John Marshall wrote the opinion in this Circuit Court case and held that the writ of coram nobis is distinguishable from the writ of error and therefore not subject to the writ of error's statute of limitations. The first Supreme Court case mentioning the writ of coram nobis (using the term coram vobis) is the 1833 case, Pickett's Heirs v. Legerwood. In this case, the Court determined that the writ was available to correct its own errors, but the same remedy was also available using the preferred method of submitting a motion to the court. Eighty years later, in 1914, the Supreme Court reached a similar conclusion in United States v. Mayer. Thus, while federal courts confirmed the writ of coram nobis was available to federal courts, this remedy was rarely necessary or appropriate in federal courts throughout the nineteenth century for the following two reasons:
Courts generally considered the writ of coram nobis to be restricted to correct only technical errors, such as discovery of a defendant being under age, evidence that a defendant died before the verdict, or errors made by the court clerk in the recording of the proceedings.
Petitioners could raise a "motion to amend" to correct most of errors also corrected by the writ of coram nobis. Although courts recognized that the writ of coram nobis could also reverse the judgement on such defects, the preferred practice was to present the court with a motion to amend.

1946 amendments to the Rules of Civil Procedure 
In 1946, Congress amended the Federal Rules of Civil Procedure and specifically abolished the writ of coram nobis in federal civil cases. Prior to enactment of these amendments, Congress reviewed all relief previously provided for civil cases through the writ of coram nobis and adopted those avenues of relief into the rules; therefore, eliminating the need for the writ in federal civil cases. In the amendment, Congress expressly abolished the writ of coram nobis in Rule 60(b). Later, in 2007, Congress restructured the format of Rule 60, and moved the language expressly abolishing the writ of coram nobis in civil proceedings from Rule 60(b) to Rule 60(e) in the Federal Rules of Civil Procedure.

History of post-conviction remedies available to former federal prisoners from 1789 to 1954

Post-conviction remedies for former federal prisoners prior to 1867
In 1790, one year after Congress passed the Judiciary Act establishing federal courts, Congress enacted the Crimes Act which created the first comprehensive list of federal offenses. From 1790 until 1867, there are few, if any, records of individuals challenging a federal criminal conviction after completion of the prison sentence. Two primary reasons explain the absence of any challenges to a conviction by former federal prisoners:
The Crimes List provided only twenty-three federal crimes. Seven of these crimes, including treason and murder, were punishable by death. (In comparison, today there are approximately 3,600 to 4,500 federal statutes that impose criminal punishments.) There are an estimated 500,000 former federal prisoners. Despite this large population, recent cases where a former federal prisoner is able to find new information sufficient to reverse the conviction are exceedingly rare. Thus, the chances of this type of case arising prior to 1867, when the federal prison population was significantly smaller, are even more remote.
There were few collateral consequences stemming from a conviction at this time. Generally, the reason former convicted felons seek a writ of coram nobis is to eliminate collateral consequences ensuing the challenged conviction. Collateral consequences are indirect consequences of a conviction.  While direct consequences of a conviction are usually issued by a judge in the sentencing phase of a case (such as a prison sentence, probation, fines and restitution); indirect consequences of a conviction are not contained within a court sentence. Collateral consequences may include loss of voting privileges, loss of professional licenses, inability to qualify for some employment and housing opportunities, and damage to the person's reputation.

The Habeas Corpus Act of 1867
The American Civil War is historically significant upon the rights of former federal prisoners in two ways. First, Congress enacted the Habeas Corpus Act of 1867 to prevent abuses following the civil war. This Act expanded the writ of habeas corpus to any person, including former prisoners. Second, states began imposing more collateral consequences upon those convicted of crimes; thus, providing more reasons why a person would want to have a wrongful conviction overturned. The loss of voting privileges was one of the most significant collateral consequences of a felony conviction. In 1800, no state prohibited convicted felons from voting; but by end of the U.S. Civil War, nearly 80% of state legislatures had passed laws barring felons the right to vote.

Slavery was legal in the United States until the 1860s. In the 1860 U.S. presidential election, Republicans, led by Abraham Lincoln, supported the elimination of slavery. This controversial issue was the catalyst for the American Civil War that began in 1861 following the election of Lincoln and concluded in 1865. On March 3, 1865, President Lincoln signed a joint resolution declaring wives and children of persons in the armed forces to be free; and on December 18, 1865, the Thirteenth Amendment to the United States Constitution became effective. This Amendment abolished slavery and involuntary servitude in the United States. The purpose of the Habeas Act was to provide "what legislation is necessary to enable the courts of the United States to enforce the freedom of the wife and children of soldiers of the United States, and also to enforce the liberty of all persons".

The Habeas Corpus Act of 1867 expanded the jurisdiction of the writ of habeas corpus to "any person". One year later, the Supreme Court implied that this Act had no custody requirements. The Court said the Act "is of the most comprehensive character. It brings within the habeas corpus jurisdiction of every court and of every judge every possible case of privation of liberty contrary to the National Constitution, treaties, or laws. It is impossible to widen this jurisdiction." The Court's interpretation of this act seemed to eliminate the writ of coram nobis in criminal cases because any person challenging a conviction, regardless of whether the person is in prison or not, could have raised the claim through the writ of habeas corpus.

Although the Act expanded habeas jurisdiction to "any person", it also required that an application for the writ include "facts concerning the detention of the party applying, [and] in whose custody he or she is detained". In 1885, the Supreme Court read these application requirements as an intent by Congress to restrict the writ of habeas corpus to only those who were physically restrained in jail. Thus, the Court foreclosed the writ of habeas corpus to those no longer in custody.

United States v. Morgan (1954) provides writ of coram nobis to former federal prisoners

In 1948, Congress passed legislation that would lead to the official recognition of the writ of coram nobis in federal courts. The Act of June 25, 1948 combined two pieces of legislation:
Congress passed the Act to organize all laws of the United States into a single source of reference, known as the United States Code (abbreviated U.S.C.). Any law (or statute) ever passed by Congress can be found in the United States Code.  The U.S.C. is divided into 50 titles. Within each title is a chapter, and within each chapter is a section. For example, one of the titles created in the Act was Title 28 – Judiciary and Judicial Procedure. Chapter 153 of this title is the chapter on Habeas Corpus. Section 2255 of this title is the section providing how prisoners can challenge a conviction. In legal documents, this section is commonly abbreviated 28 U.S.C. §2255.
Congress passed the Act to solve a problem with habeas corpus petitions. The Habeas Corpus Act of 1867 instructed prisoners to file a writ of habeas corpus with the district court whose territory included the prison.  For example, those imprisoned at Alcatraz Island, California were required to file a writ of habeas corpus in the United States District Court for the Northern District of California, even if the prisoner's conviction and sentence originated from a federal court in another district or state. This rule led to administrative difficulties, especially for the five district courts whose territorial jurisdiction included major federal prisons. The Act of June 25, 1948 codified existing federal habeas corpus statutes and judicial habeas practice at 28 U.S.C. §2255 and changed the jurisdiction from the district of confinement to the district of sentence; however, the jurisdictional change was the only change Congress intended.

The Act of June 25, 1948 reworded the habeas corpus sections of the United States Code to provide only those individuals in-custody (as a result of a criminal conviction in federal court) access to the writ of habeas corpus. For those who had been convicted of a federal crime but were no longer in custody, the question was whether the 1948 Act abolished all post-conviction review of a former prisoner's conviction.

In 1952 Robert Morgan, a former federal prisoner who had completed his sentence, petitioned to have his conviction overturned based on information he claimed to be unavailable at the time of his conviction. The district court denied his petition because Morgan was no longer in custody for the conviction he sought to overturn. Morgan appealed that decision. In 1953, the appellate court disagreed with the district court and determined that the writ of coram nobis was available to Morgan. The government appealed the appellate court's decision to the US Supreme Court.

The first question in United States v. Morgan was whether Congress intended to abolish any post-conviction remedies to former prisoners when it restricted the writ of habeas corpus to prisoners only. If the Supreme Court decided that Congress did not intend to abolish any post-conviction remedies to former prisoners, then the second question in United States v. Morgan was whether the writ of coram nobis was available to challenge a conviction after completion of the petitioner's sentence. On January 4, 1954, the Supreme Court announced its decision. The Court first determined that Congress did not intend within the 1948 Act to eliminate all reviews of criminal convictions for petitioners who had completed their sentence.  Although the 1948 Act restricted former prisoners from challenging a conviction with a writ of habeas corpus, the Court determined by reviewing the legislative notes that Congress did not intend to abolish post-conviction challenges to a sentence from former prisoners.  Justice Stanley Reed, who authored the majority opinion for the Court, wrote;
[T]he purpose of § 2255 was "to meet practical difficulties" in the administration of federal habeas corpus jurisdiction. ... Nowhere in the history of Section 2255 do we find any purpose to impinge upon prisoners' rights of collateral attack upon their convictions. We know of nothing in the legislative history that indicates a different conclusion. We do not think that the enactment of § 2255 is a bar to this motion, and we hold that the District Court has power to grant [the writ of coram nobis]. Although Congress did restrict the writ of habeas corpus to prisoners, the Court determined that the All Writs Act provides federal courts the authority to issue a writ of coram nobis to former prisoners whenever new evidence proves the underlying conviction was a result of a fundamental error. Thus, Morgan officially recognized the writ of coram nobis as the sole means for post-incarceration judicial review of federal convictions.

Source of rules and procedures governing coram nobis proceedings
United States v. Morgan provides broad, general guidance to courts on the rules and procedures in coram nobis proceedings, but since the Morgan case in 1954, the Supreme Court and Congress seldom provide lower courts additional guidance. Thus, Appellate courts generally fill in the gaps and provide guidance for rules and procedures unclarified by Congress and the Supreme Court; however, the interpretations of rules and procedures of coram nobis may differ in each appellate court. Thus, for a former federal prisoner who is attempting to decide whether to file a petition for the writ of coram nobis, it is necessary to understand the source of the rules and procedures.

The United States Constitution is the supreme law of the United States. Article One of the Constitution creates the legislature and provides Congress the means to create and enact laws. Article Three of the Constitution creates the judiciary and provides courts the means to interpret laws. Other than the writ of habeas corpus, the Constitution has no language permitting or restricting courts from issuing specific writs, including the writ of coram nobis.

Congressional enactments
The United States Congress enacts laws or statutes, and codifies these statutes in the United States Code. In contrast to the writ of habeas corpus, Congress has seldom enacted statutes regulating the writ of coram nobis. Statutes enacted by Congress regulating the writ of coram nobis are:
In 1789, Congress enacted the Judicial Act. The All Writs Act section of the Judiciary Act provides federal courts the authority to issue "all writs necessary or appropriate in aid of their respective jurisdictions and agreeable to the usages and principles of law". The All Writs Act gives courts the ability to decide which specific writs utilized in English courts are available and appropriate in U.S. federal courts. While Congress provides federal courts the authority to issue writs, it does not provide courts the authority to issue specific writs by name, such as writs of mandamus or writs of coram nobis.
In 1946, Congress amended the Federal Rules of Civil Procedure to abolish the writ of coram nobis in federal civil cases. Prior to enacting this statute, Congress reviewed all issues previously addressed by federal courts in writ of coram nobis proceedings, and incorporated remedies for those issues within the procedures. Rule 60(e) of this Procedure originated from this statute and states, "The following are abolished: bills of review, bills in the nature of bills of review, and writs of coram nobis, coram vobis, and audita querela."
In 2002, Congress enacted Rule 4(a)(1)(C) of the Federal Rules of Appellate Procedure to resolve a conflict among the federal appellate courts regarding the time limitations to file an appeal from an order granting or denying an application for a writ of error coram nobis. Prior to this amendment, the federal appellate courts were divided on whether coram nobis appeals have a 10-day time limit or a 60-day time limit. Rule 4(a)(1)(C) resolved the conflict and established a 60-day time limit to file the notice of appeal from a district court's judgement in a coram nobis proceeding.

United States Supreme Court decisions
Following the Constitution and Congressional statutes, the next highest source for direction and guidance of rules and procedures is the United States Supreme Court. The Supreme Court is the highest federal court. Lower courts, such as federal appellate courts and federal district courts, must follow the decisions of the Supreme Court. The Supreme Court has discretionary appellate jurisdiction, meaning the Court chooses to hear cases for reasons it deems "compelling reasons" (such as resolving a conflict in the interpretation of a federal law or resolving an important matter of law). Federal courts, including the Supreme Court, cannot override any law enacted by Congress unless the law violates the Constitution. Federal courts also cannot repeal a statute unless Congress clearly intended to repeal the statute.
In 1954, United States v. Morgan provides writ of coram nobis to former federal prisoners.  The Court determined coram nobis relief "should be allowed ... only under circumstances compelling such action to achieve justice". Specifically, the circumstances must include all three of these conditions:
to remedy errors "of the most fundamental character"
when "no other remedy [is] then available"
"sound reasons [exist] for failure to seek appropriate earlier relief".

Since 1954, the Supreme Court granted review of only one other coram nobis case. In 2009, the Court clarified that Article I military courts have jurisdiction to entertain coram nobis petitions to consider allegations that an earlier judgment of conviction was flawed in a fundamental respect. Other than providing military courts the authority to issue the writ, the Supreme Court has declined to provide federal courts additional guidance in coram nobis proceedings. Appellate courts have occasionally criticized the Supreme Court for failing to provide this additional guidance. The Seventh Circuit called the writ of coram nobis, "a phantom in the Supreme Court's cases" and contends "Two ambiguous decisions on the subject in the history of the Supreme Court are inadequate." The Sixth Circuit took a similar stance saying, "The Supreme Court has decided only one coram nobis case in the last forty-two years, Morgan, and that opinion is ambiguous concerning whether proof of an ongoing civil disability is required." The First Circuit wrote that its decision of time limitations "derives from the Morgan Court's cryptic characterization of coram nobis as a 'step in the criminal case.  In another case, the First Circuit writes, "The metes and bounds of the writ of coram nobis are poorly defined and the Supreme Court has not developed an easily readable roadmap for its issuance."

Federal courts of appeals decisions
While the United States Supreme Court is the highest court in the United States federal court system, the United States courts of appeals, or circuit courts, are the intermediate appellate courts. There are thirteen U.S. courts of appeals. Eleven courts of appeals are numbered First through Eleventh and have geographical boundaries of various sizes. For example, the Fifth Circuit Court of Appeals consists of all federal courts in only three states: Louisiana, Mississippi and Texas, while the Ninth Circuit Court of Appeals consists of nine western states and two U.S. territories. There is also a Court of Appeals for the District of Columbia and a Court of Appeals for the Federal Circuit. Other tribunals also have "Court of Appeals" in their titles, such as the Court of Appeals for the Armed Forces, which hears appeals in court-martial cases.

Congressional statutes and Supreme Court decisions are controlling over courts of appeals. Absent statutory rules or Supreme Court case law, a court of appeals decision establishes a binding precedent for the courts in its circuit; however, a court of appeals decision is not binding for courts in other circuits. Generally, when a court of appeals hears an issue raised for the first time in that court, it arrives at the same conclusion as other courts of appeals on identical issues raised before those courts. However, whenever the courts of appeals arrive at different conclusions on the same issue, it creates a "circuit split". The Supreme Court receives thousands of petitions each year, but only agrees to hear fewer than 100 of these cases.  One of the most compelling reasons for the Supreme Court to accept a case is to resolve a circuit split. Currently, a circuit split exists in coram nobis cases involving the definition of "adverse consequences". The Supreme Court determined in United States v. Morgan that a petition for a writ of coram nobis must demonstrate that adverse consequences exist from the criminal conviction. Some courts of appeals determined adverse consequences occur with any collateral consequence of a conviction while other courts of appeals have limited "adverse consequences" to only a few collateral consequences of a conviction.

Federal district court decisions
District courts must abide by congressional statutes, Supreme Court decisions, and decisions of the court of appeals in the federal judicial circuit in which the district court is located. Whenever a district court hears an issue that is not specifically addressed by statute or by case law of a higher court, district courts often "develop the record". In case of an appeal, the higher courts have the district court's reasoned decision as guidance. A developed record not only greatly facilitates the process of appellate review but also ensures that the district court has carefully considered the issues and applied the applicable law.

Criteria for the writ

Rules for petitioners
Writs of coram nobis are rare in U.S. federal courts due to the stringent criteria for issuance of the writ. Morgan established the following criteria required in a coram nobis petition in order for a federal court to issue the writ:
A petition for a writ of coram nobis is a collateral attack on a judgment in a federal criminal case. A "collateral attack" is defined as an attack on a judgment in a proceeding other than a direct appeal.
A petition for a writ of coram nobis in a federal court must seek to vacate a federal criminal conviction. A writ of coram nobis is not available in federal courts to challenge a conviction in a state court. The federal government operates its own coram nobis procedures independent from state courts. Those seeking to attack a state judgment must follow the post-conviction remedies offered by that state. A writ of coram nobis is also not available for civil cases. Federal Rule of Civil Procedure 60(b) specifically abolished the writ of coram nobis in civil cases.
A petition for a writ of coram nobis may only be filed after a sentence has been served and the petitioner is no longer in custody. A person who is on probation is considered "in custody". Anyone filing a coram nobis petition while in custody will have their petition either denied for lack of jurisdiction or categorized as a petition for a writ of habeas corpus pursuant to 28 U.S.C. § 2255 (or successive 28 U.S.C. § 2255 if the petitioner has previously filed a § 2255 petition).
A petition for a writ of coram nobis must be addressed to the sentencing court. To challenge a conviction, the petitioner must send a request for a writ of coram nobis to the court clerk of the district court where the petitioner's conviction originated. In other words, a petitioner must request for the writ in the sentencing court, rather than any convenient federal court.
A petition for a writ of coram nobis must provide valid reasons for not attacking the conviction earlier. Petitioners need to show "reasonable diligence", where legitimate justifications exist for not raising challenges to their convictions sooner or through more usual channels (such as a § 2255 petition while in custody). A delay may be considered reasonable when the applicable law was recently changed and made retroactive, when new evidence was discovered that the petitioner could not reasonably have located earlier, or when the petitioner was improperly advised by counsel not to pursue habeas relief.
A petition for a writ of coram nobis must raise new issues of law or fact that could not have been raised while the petitioner was in custody. In Morgan, the Court announced the writ was available where no other remedy is available. However, petitioners occasionally misinterpret this statement as an opportunity to re-raise arguments from previous post-conviction petitions. Appellate courts have consistently determined that the writ of coram nobis cannot be used as a "second chance" to challenge a conviction using the same grounds raised in a previous challenge.
Petitioners who filed a § 2255 motion and it was denied while in custody must obtain authorization from the district court in order to file a coram nobis petition. Currently, this rule only applies to those in the Eighth Circuit Court of Appeals. In 2018, the Eighth Circuit became the first appellate court to decide whether a petition for writ of coram nobis is governed by the Antiterrorism and Effective Death Penalty Act of 1996 ("AEDPA") restrictions on successive relief as defined in § 2255(h)(1) and (2). The Eighth Circuit held that coram nobis petitioners who filed a § 2255 motion, while in custody and the motion was denied while the petitioner remained in custody, is restricted by AEDPA from filing a coram nobis petition without first obtaining authorization from the district court to file the coram nobis petition. This requirement is different from those in custody who are required to obtain authorization from the appellate court in order to file a successive § 2255 motion. Other federal appellate courts have yet to issue an opinion on this question.
A petition for a writ of coram nobis must provide adverse consequences which exist from the conviction. A circuit split exists on this requirement. The First, Second, Third, Fifth, Seventh, Eighth, and Tenth circuit courts administer a "civil disabilities test" which requires a coram nobis petitioner to prove that his conviction produced ongoing collateral consequences; however, the Fourth, Ninth and Eleventh Circuits have held that the petitioner need not show that he is suffering from an ongoing "civil disability" because "collateral consequences flow from any criminal conviction". The Sixth circuit has granted coram nobis relief without mentioning this requirement.
The writ of coram nobis is an extraordinary remedy to correct errors of the most fundamental character. The error to be corrected must be an error which resulted in a complete miscarriage of justice. In other words, the error is one that has rendered the proceeding itself irregular and invalid. Typically, the same errors that are deemed grounds for Section 2255 habeas relief also justify coram nobis relief. For those claiming actual innocence, a fundamental miscarriage of justice occurs where a constitutional violation has resulted in the conviction of one who is actually innocent.

Procedural rules in federal district courts
District court clerks should file petitions for writs of coram nobis under the original case number In Morgan, the Supreme Court provided that the writ of coram nobis is a step in the criminal case and not the beginning of a separate civil proceeding. As a result, district courts, such as those in the Ninth Circuit, file petitions for writs of coram nobis under the original criminal case number.
District courts should construe incorrectly titled petitions with the appropriate title. Whenever a federal district court receives an incorrectly labeled or incorrectly titled petition, the court should construe the petition correctly.  District courts should construe a coram nobis petition from a federal prisoner as a petition for writ of habeas corpus. Similarly, district courts should construe a habeas corpus petition from a former federal prisoner as a petition for writ of coram nobis. Federal courts have determined that a person on probation is still a federal prisoner; therefore, petitioners in this category must file a petition for writ of habeas corpus. A federal prisoner convicted of more than one federal crime may file a petition for writ of coram nobis to challenge any conviction where the sentence is complete; but the prisoner must file a writ of habeas corpus to challenge any conviction where the sentence is not complete.

Procedural rules in federal appellate courts
Appeals from coram nobis orders are subject to a 60-day filing period. Until 2002, two provisions in Morgan divided the federal appellate courts interpretation on the time limits to file an appeal from a district court's decision on a coram nobis petition. First, Morgan held that "the writ of coram nobis is a step in the criminal case". Second, Morgan held that "the writ of coram nobis is of the same general character as the writ of habeas corpus". This created a conflict in the courts of appeals regarding the time limits that applied to appeals from coram nobis orders. In 2002, Congress added language to the Federal Rules of Appellate Procedure that clarified an application for a writ of error coram nobis is subject to a 60-day filing period.
Appeals from coram nobis orders do not require a certificate of appealability. In 1996, Congress enacted the Antiterrorism and Effective Death Penalty Act of 1996 ("AEDPA") which included language that limits the power of federal judges to grant motions for habeas relief, including motions for relief pursuant to 28 U.S.C. § 2255. AEDPA requires a Certificate of Appealability in order to appeal a district court's ruling on a habeas corpus petition. Unlike the writ of habeas corpus, a Certificate of Appealability is not required in order to appeal a district court's ruling on a coram nobis petition. Neither the 28 U.S.C. § 1651(a) statute making the writ of coram nobis available in federal courts in criminal matters nor any Federal Rule of Appellate Procedure requires a certificate of appealability before an appeal may be taken, nor does such a requirement appear in the case law. Some prisoners have attempted to file coram nobis petitions if AEDPA prevents the petitioner from filing under § 2255. However, federal courts have consistently held that prisoners may not resort to the writ of coram nobis in order to bypass AEDPA's gatekeeping requirements.
The standard of review from a district court's denial of a coram nobis petition is similar to the standard of review from a district court's denial of a habeas corpus petition. Generally, the standard of review is that any district court's determinations on questions of law are reviewed de novo, but that district court's determinations on questions of fact are reviewed for clear error (or clearly erroneous error). Under de novo review of federal coram nobis cases, the appellate court acts as if it were considering the question of law for the first time, affording no deference to the decision of the district court. Under Clear Error review of federal coram nobis cases, the appellate court must have a "definite and firm conviction that a mistake has been committed" by the district court.

U.S. state courts

Only sixteen state courts and District of Columbia courts recognize the availability of writs of coram nobis or coram vobis. Each state is free to operate its own coram nobis procedures independent of other state courts as well as the federal court system. The writ of coram nobis is not available in a majority of states because those states have enacted uniform post-conviction acts that provide a streamlined, single remedy for obtaining relief from a judgment of conviction, and that remedy is available to petitioners who are no longer in custody. States that have replaced writs of coram nobis with remedies within their post-conviction proceedings are also independent of other state courts as well as the federal court system. These proceedings enacted by state legislatures may either be more or less stringent than the writs it replaced or the post-conviction proceedings of other states.

Availability
The following table provides whether each state's courts are authorized to issue a writ of coram nobis (or a writ of coram vobis), or provides the state statute which replaced or abolished the writ.

{| class="wikitable"
|- bgcolor="#CCCCCC"
! State !! Writ of coram nobis replaced/abolished by
|-
| style="background:#FFFFE6;"| Alabama               || style="background:#FFFFE6;"|Coram nobis recognized by Alabama state courts
|-
| Alaska                || Alaska Criminal Rule 35.1<ref>{{cite court |litigants= Flanigan v. State |vol=3 |reporter= P. 3d |opinion= 372|pinpoint= 373 |court= Alaska Court of Appeals |date= 2000 |url= https://scholar.google.com/scholar_case?case=1509418687300954447}}</ref>
|-
| Arizona               || Arizona Rules of Criminal Procedure 32.1
|-
| style="background:#FFFFE6;"|Arkansas              || style="background:#FFFFE6;"|Coram nobis recognized by Arkansas state courts
|-
| style="background:#FFFFE6;"|California            || style="background:#FFFFE6;"|Coram nobis recognized by California state courts
|-
| Colorado              || Colorado Rules of Criminal Procedure 35
|-
| style="background:#FFFFE6;"|Connecticut           || style="background:#FFFFE6;"|Coram nobis recognized by Connecticut state courts
|-
| Delaware              || Delaware Superior Court Criminal Rule 61
|-
| style="background:#FFFFE6;"|District of Columbia || style="background:#FFFFE6;"|Coram nobis recognized by District of Columbia courts 
|-
| Florida               || Florida Rule of Criminal Procedure 3.850
|-
| Georgia || Official Code of Georgia Annotated § 5-6-35 (a) (7)
|-
| Hawaii                || Hawaiʻi Rules of Penal Procedure Rule 40(a)(1)
|-
| Idaho                 || Idaho Code Annotated § 19-4901
|-
| Illinois              || Illinois Code of Civil Procedure § 2-1401
|-
| Indiana               || Indiana Rules of Post-Conviction Procedure § 1
|-
| Iowa                  || Iowa Code Annotated § 822.1
|-
| Kansas                || Kansas Statutes Annotated 60-260
|-
| Kentucky              || Kentucky Rules of Civil Procedure CR 60.02
|-
| Louisiana             || Louisiana Code of Criminal Procedure Art. 930.8
|-
| Maine                 || Maine Revised Statutes 15 § 2122, 2124
|-
| style="background:#FFFFE6;"|Maryland              || style="background:#FFFFE6;"|Coram nobis recognized by Maryland state courts
|-
| Massachusetts         || Massachusetts Rules of Criminal Procedure Rule 30 (a)
|-
| Michigan              || Michigan Court Rules 6.502(C)(3)
|-
| Minnesota             || Minnesota statute. § 590.01 subd. 2
|-
| Mississippi           || Mississippi Code Annotated section 99-39-3(1)
|-
| Missouri              || Missouri Rules of Criminal Procedure Rule 29.15
|-
| Montana               || Montana Code Annotated § 46–21-101
|-
| style="background:#FFFFE6;"|Nebraska              || style="background:#FFFFE6;"|Coram nobis recognized by Nebraska state courts
|-
| style="background:#FFFFE6;"|Nevada                || style="background:#FFFFE6;"|Coram nobis recognized by Nevada state courts
|-
| style="background:#FFFFE6;"|New Hampshire                || style="background:#FFFFE6;"|Coram nobis recognized by New Hampshire state courts
|-
| New Jersey            || New Jersey Court Rule 3:22
|-
| New Mexico            || New Mexico Rules Annotated Rule 1-060(B)(6)
|-
| style="background:#FFFFE6;"|New York              || style="background:#FFFFE6;"|Coram nobis recognized by New York state courts
|-
| North Carolina        || North Carolina General Statutes § 15A-1411 (2009)
|-
| North Dakota          || North Dakota Century Code § 29–32.1-01 (2006)
|-
| Ohio                  || Ohio Revised Code Annotated § 2953.21
|-
| Oklahoma              || Oklahoma Statutes Title 22, § 1080
|-
| style="background:#FFFFE6;"|Oregon               || style="background:#FFFFE6;"|Coram nobis recognized by Oregon state courts
|-
| Pennsylvania          || Pennsylvania Consolidated Statutes 42 § 9542
|-
| Rhode Island          || Rhode Island General Laws § 10–9.1-1 (2012)
|-
| South Carolina        || South Carolina Code of Laws Annotated § 17-27-20 (2003)
|-
| style="background:#FFFFE6;"|South Dakota          || style="background:#FFFFE6;"|Coram nobis recognized by South Dakota state courts
|-
| style="background:#FFFFE6;"|Tennessee             || style="background:#FFFFE6;"|Coram nobis recognized by Tennessee state courts
|-
| Texas                 ||  Texas Code of Criminal Procedure article 11.05
|-
| Utah                  || Utah Code Annotated §§ 78B-9-102, -104
|-
| style="background:#FFFFE6;"|Vermont               || style="background:#FFFFE6;"|Coram nobis recognized by Vermont state courts
|-
| style="background:#FFF8F5;"|Virginia              || style="background:#FFF8F5;"|Coram  recognized by Virginia state courts
|-
| Washington            || Washington Rules of Appellate Procedure 16.4(b)
|-
| style="background:#FFFFE6;"|West Virginia         || style="background:#FFFFE6;"|Coram nobis recognized by West Virginia state courts
|-
| style="background:#FFFFE6;"|Wisconsin             || style="background:#FFFFE6;"|Coram nobis recognized by Wisconsin state courts
|-
| Wyoming               || Wyoming Rules of Criminal Procedure Rule 35
|}

Alabama
Alabama state courts strictly follow the common law definition of the writ of coram nobis where the writ may only be issued to correct errors of fact.  The writ may not be issued to correct errors of law.  The writ has only been applied to juveniles. The Alabama Court of Criminal Appeals provided the following background and guidelines for coram nobis petitions for state courts in Alabama (citations and quotations removed):

Arkansas
Arkansas state courts may issue a writ of coram nobis for only four types of claims: insanity at the time of trial, a coerced guilty plea, material evidence withheld by the prosecutor, or a third-party confession to the crime during the time between conviction and appeal. The Supreme Court of Arkansas provides the following background and guidelines of coram nobis petitions for state courts in Arkansas (citations and quotations removed):

California
California state courts strictly follow the common-law definition of the writ of coram nobis where the writ may only be issued to correct errors of fact. The writ may not be issued to correct errors of law. The Supreme Court of California provided the following background and guidelines of coram nobis petitions for state courts in California (citations and quotations removed): 

Connecticut
Connecticut state courts strictly follow the common-law definition of the writ of coram nobis where the writ may only be issued to correct errors of fact. The writ may not be issued to correct errors of law. The Supreme Court of Connecticut provided the following background and guidelines of coram nobis petitions for state courts in Connecticut (citations and quotations removed):

District of Columbia
District of Columbia courts were established in 1970. The court's authority is derived from the United States Congress rather than from the inherent sovereignty of the states. District of Columbia courts may issue the writ of coram nobis to correct either errors of fact or errors of law. The District of Columbia Court of Appeals provided the following background and guidelines of coram nobis petitions for District of Columbia courts (citations and quotations removed):

Maryland
Maryland state courts may issue the writ of coram nobis to correct either errors of fact or errors of law. The Maryland Court of Appeals provided the following background and guidelines of coram nobis petitions for state courts in Maryland (citations and quotations removed):

Nebraska
Nebraska state courts strictly follow the common-law definition of the writ of coram nobis where the writ may only be issued to correct errors of fact. The writ may not be issued to correct errors of law. The Supreme Court of Nebraska provided the following background and guidelines of coram nobis petitions for state courts in Nebraska (citations and quotations removed):

Nevada
Nevada state courts strictly follow the common-law definition of the writ of coram nobis where the writ may only be issued to correct errors of fact. The writ may not be issued to correct errors of law. The Supreme Court of Nevada provided the following background and guidelines of coram nobis petitions for state courts in Nevada (citations and quotations removed):

New Hampshire
New Hampshire courts may issue a writ of coram nobis to correct errors of fact. It is currently undetermined whether the writ may be issued to correct errors of law. The New Hampshire Supreme Court provided the following background and guidelines of coram nobis petitions for state courts in New Hampshire (citations and quotations removed):

New York
New York state courts may issue a writ of coram nobis only for claims of ineffective assistance of appellate counsel. The Court of Appeals of the State of New York provided the following background and guidelines of coram nobis petitions for state courts in New York (citations and quotations removed):

Oregon
In November 2018, the Oregon Court of Appeals determined that the writ of coram nobis is available in rare cases where newly discovered evidence provides clear and convincing evidence of actual innocence. The Oregon Court of Appeals provided the following background and guidelines of coram nobis petitions for state courts in Oregon (citations and quotations removed):

South Dakota
South Dakota state courts strictly follow the common-law definition of the writ of coram nobis where the writ may only be issued to correct errors of fact. The writ may not be issued to correct errors of law. The Supreme Court of South Dakota provided the following background and guidelines of coram nobis petitions for state courts in South Dakota (citations and quotations removed):

Tennessee
Tennessee courts may issue a writ of coram nobis only for subsequently or newly discovered evidence relating to matters which were litigated at the trial if the judge determines that such evidence may have resulted in a different judgment had it been presented at the trial. The Supreme Court of Tennessee provided the following background and guidelines of coram nobis petitions for state courts in Tennessee (citations and quotations removed):

Vermont
Vermont state courts strictly follow the common-law definition of the writ of coram nobis where the writ may only be issued to correct errors of fact. The writ may not be issued to correct errors of law. The Supreme Court of Vermont provided the following background and guidelines of coram nobis petitions for state courts in Vermont (citations and quotations removed):

Virginia
Virginia state courts strictly follow the common-law definition of the writ of coram vobis where the writ may only be issued to correct errors of fact. The writ may not be issued to correct errors of law. The Supreme Court of Virginia provided the following background and guidelines of coram vobis petitions for state courts in Virginia (citations and quotations removed):

West Virginia
West Virginia state courts may issue the writ of coram nobis to correct either errors of fact or errors of law. The Supreme Court of Appeals of West Virginia provided the following background and guidelines of coram nobis petitions for state courts in West Virginia (citations and quotations removed):

Wisconsin
Wisconsin state courts strictly follow the common-law definition of the writ of coram nobis where the writ may only be issued to correct errors of fact. The writ may not be issued to correct errors of law. The Court of Appeals of Wisconsin provided the following background and guidelines of coram nobis petitions for state courts in Wisconsin (citations and quotations removed):

Notable cases

Gordon Hirabayashi, Minoru Yasui, and Fred Korematsu
Gordon Hirabayashi, Minoru Yasui, and Fred Korematsu are best known for their principled resistance to the internment of Japanese Americans during World War II. All three had their convictions overturned through writs of coram nobis, and they were each awarded the Presidential Medal of Freedom.

After the bombing of Pearl Harbor on December 7, 1941, President Franklin D. Roosevelt's administration concluded that Japanese Americans living in the West Coast were a security threat, even though the Federal Bureau of Investigation and the Office of Naval Intelligence had argued the opposite, and thus authorized the military to secure areas from which "any or all persons may be excluded". As a result, Japanese Americans were subject to curfew and other restrictions before being forced into internment camps. Hirabayashi, Yasui, and Korematsu, who were not acquainted with each other at the time, each defied the internment and were convicted for their resistance. Their convictions would be affirmed by the U.S. Supreme Court between 1943 and 1944. Four decades after the Court's rulings, lawyers, including civil rights attorney, Peter Irons, re-opened their wartime convictions on the basis of newly discovered evidence of governmental misconduct. The new evidence indicated the government intentionally withheld The Ringle Report, a report drafted by the Office of Naval Intelligence, which would have undermined the administration's position of the military actions, as it finally concluded that most Japanese Americans did not pose a national security threat during WWII.

Gordon Hirabayashi was born in April 1918 in Seattle, Washington. He was a senior student at the University of Washington at the time when Japanese Americans were ordered to report to internment camps. Although he first considered accepting internment, he ultimately defied it. In May 1942, Hirabayashi turned himself in to the FBI. After being convicted in October 1942 for the curfew violation, he was sentenced to 90 days in prison. He also served a one-year sentence at McNeil Island Penitentiary for Selective Service violations when he refused to answer questions which singled out Japanese Americans on the basis of race alone. He appealed to the Supreme Court where, in 1943, his conviction was upheld in Hirabayashi v. United States. In 1987, the United States Court of Appeals for the Ninth Circuit granted a writ of coram nobis which effectively overturned his criminal conviction. Hirabayashi died in January 2012, and he posthumously received the Presidential Medal of Freedom in May 2012.

Minoru Yasui was born in 1916 in Hood River, Oregon. He attended law school at the University of Oregon and became the first Japanese American lawyer in Oregon in 1939. Upon the declaration of war, Yasui attempted to report for military duty, but his services were refused nine times. After hearing the news of internment, Yasui planned his legal challenge to the government's policies. In March 1942, he deliberately disobeyed the military implemented curfew in Portland, Oregon by walking around the downtown area and then presenting himself at a police station after 11:00 pm in order to test the curfew's constitutionality. He was convicted in November 1942. Yasui appealed to the Supreme Court where, in 1943, his conviction was upheld in Yasui v. United States. In January 1984, his conviction was overturned when the U.S. District Court in Oregon granted his writ of coram nobis. Yasui died in 1986, and he posthumously received the Presidential Medal of Freedom in November 2015.

Fred Korematsu was born in 1919 in Oakland, California. He attempted to enlist with the United States Navy when called for military duty under the Selective Training and Service Act of 1940, but he was rejected due to stomach ulcers. In March 1942, when Japanese Americans were ordered to report to assembly centers, he refused and went into hiding in the Oakland area. He was arrested in May 1942, and held at the Presidio of San Francisco military detention center until his conviction in September 1942. The U.S. Supreme Court in December 1944 upheld his conviction in Korematsu v. United States. In November 1983, the U.S. District Court in San Francisco formally granted the writ of coram nobis and vacated his conviction. He was awarded the Presidential Medal of Freedom in 1998, and died in March 2005.

George Stinney

In December 2014, a writ of coram nobis was granted by a South Carolina state court to posthumously vacate the conviction of George Stinney, a 14-year-old black boy who was convicted of murder and executed in June 1944. Stinney was convicted in 1944 in a one-day trial of the first-degree murder of two white girls: 11-year-old Betty June Binnicker and 8-year-old Mary Emma Thames. After being arrested, Stinney was said to have confessed to the crime; however, there was no written record of his confession apart from notes provided by an investigating deputy, and no transcript of the brief trial. On June 16, 1944, Stinney was executed as a result of the conviction. On December 17, 2014, Stinney's conviction was posthumously vacated 70 years after his execution, because the judge ruled that he had not been given a fair trial; he had no effective defense and therefore his Sixth Amendment rights had been violated.

United Kingdom
The common law writ of error contra nobis and its equitable equivalent, the supplemental bill of review, do not appear to have survived the reforms to English law made in the last quarter of the nineteenth century.

Writs of error as a separate proceeding were abolished by  section 148 of the Common Law Procedure Act 1852 (15 & 16 Vict., c.76), which instead provided that "the Proceeding to Error Shall be a Step in the Cause". Error was finally abolished 23 years later in 1875, when Schedule I, Order 58, rule 1 of the Supreme Court of Judicature Act 1873 was brought into force and the Court of Appeal was created.

Fresh evidence
The modern practice at English law where a litigant seeks to rely upon evidence not known at trial is to bring an appeal.

In civil proceedings, CPR 52.11(1)(b) contains a presumption that civil appeals shall be limited to a review of a decision of the lower court, and CPR 52.11(2)(b) contains a presumption that the Court of Appeal shall not receive fresh evidence. The Court of Appeal will exercise its discretion to hear fresh evidence according to the over-riding objective in civil cases to deal with cases justly: however, three key criteria laid down by the Court of Appeal in Ladd v Marshall continue to be of relevance:

the evidence could not have been obtained with reasonable diligence for use at the trial;
the evidence must be such that, if given, it would probably have an important influence on the result of the case, though it need not be decisive;
the evidence must be such as is presumably to be believed; it must be apparently credible, though it need not be incontrovertible.

Moreover, where it is "necessary to do so in order to avoid real injustice", in "exceptional" circumstances, and where "there is no alternative effective remedy", CPR 52.17(1) permits both the High Court and the Court of Appeal to re-open a final determination of an appeal.

In criminal proceedings, the Court of Appeal also has a discretion to admit fresh evidence on appeal.  If it does so, the Court must ask itself whether, in light of the fresh evidence, the conviction is unsafe.

Special case of fraud
Soon after the passage of the Judicature Acts, it was thought that, when a judgment had been obtained by wilful fraud of the victorious party, the aggrieved party's proper recourse was to bring a new action for fraud, because to try the alleged fraud required original jurisdiction, which the Court of Appeal did not have.

In so ruling, Jessell MR made specific references to the supplemental bill of review, the equitable equivalent of the writ of error contra nobis. However, the Court drew an analogy with the old law, rather than preserving it: in agreeing with Jessell MR, James LJ observed, "if it is true that there was a fraud practised upon the Court, by which the Court was induced to make a wrong decree, the way to obtain relief will be to bring a fresh action to set aside the decree on the ground of fraud" [emphasis added].

Since the coming into force of the Civil Procedure Rules, the law has evolved further.  In Noble v Owens, the Court of Appeal held that the modern position is that it is now not necessary to commence a fresh action to cure a judgment fraudulently obtained. Instead, the powers of the Court of Appeal under CPR 52.10 are sufficiently broad to permit the Court of Appeal to refer the determination of the issue of fraud to a Judge of the High Court as part of the appeal proceedings, with a consequent saving of costs.

In criminal cases, the Court of Appeal has allowed appeals and quashed convictions on the basis of misconduct by Crown witnesses analogous to fraud, e.g., where prosecution witnesses had subsequently been convicted for giving perjured evidence during the original trial; or where police officers who took confessions from the appellants had subsequently been discredited in later proceedings.

Recent attempts to resurrect the procedure
In Cinpres Gas Injection Ltd v Melea Ltd, an unsuccessful attempt was made to resurrect the supplemental bill of review. Jacob LJ, giving the judgment of the Court of Appeal, held that an attempt to invoke the old bill of review could not succeed because, for generations, applications for rehearing on the basis of fresh evidence had been made to the Court of Appeal and, if the bill of review procedure had survived the Judicature Acts, it had long since lapsed. The judge observed that "it would make for better justice in principle for a prior decision to be impugnable on the grounds for which a bill of review once lay, namely that there was fresh evidence not discoverable by reasonable diligence, which 'entirely changes the aspect of the case (para. [100]). However, he also observed that the Court of Appeal had not been asked to consider its powers under CPR 52.17 to re-open a final appeal in "exceptional circumstances" and therefore could not say whether such an application would have succeeded.

Moreover, in a Northern Ireland case, Walsh's Application, in which an application was made for a writ of error coram nobis following an unsuccessful judicial review, Weatherup J followed the Court of Appeal in Cinpres by observing, "While the Writ developed at Common Law, I doubt if the procedure survived the appeals process introduced by the Judicature (Ireland) Act 1875", before referring to the provision of that Act dealing with the abolition of proceedings in error. The court concluded that it did not have the jurisdiction to alter the decision made on judicial review.

The above cases indicate that the Judicature Acts and the Civil Procedure Rules provide for a comprehensive system of appeals which effectively ousts the function served by the former bill of review and writ of error coram nobis, which may now be extinct in England, Wales and Northern Ireland.

See also
 All Writs Act
 Audita querela Habeas corpus in the United States
 Fundamental error
 Judiciary Act of 1789
 Post conviction
 United States v. Morgan (1954)''

References 

Writs
Legal history
Legal documents with Latin names
Legal error
Appellate review
Criminal justice
Common law legal terminology
Latin words and phrases